Indies Under Fire: The Battle for the American Bookstore  (2006)
is an American documentary film which chronicles the difficulties faced by independent bookstores in the 
information economy. The Palo Alto based Printers Inc. Bookstore which closed in 2001 is the primary focus of the film. It also explores the impact of Borders moving into two small towns filled with independent bookstores: Capitola, California and Santa Cruz, California.

Director Jacob Bricca stated that he was inspired to make the documentary in response to the closing of Printers Inc. Bookstore:
"I took the [store's closing] very personally [...] I grew up in Palo Alto and spent many hours reading and hanging out at Printers Inc. I saw the strong connection the community had to the bookstore and, like others in the film, was very distressed at its closing."

Honors
Official Selection - Wine Country Film Festival
Official Selection - Newburyport Documentary Film Festival

See also
Paperback Dreams

Notes

External links
Official website
 

2006 films
American documentary films
Works about book publishing and bookselling
2006 documentary films
Culture in the San Francisco Bay Area
Palo Alto, California
Santa Cruz, California
Films set in the San Francisco Bay Area
2000s English-language films
2000s American films